Rolduc is the name of a medieval abbey located on the edge of the town of Kerkrade in the far south-east of the Netherlands. It is today a Roman Catholic seminary with an affiliated conference center. The abbey is a rijksmonument (Dutch national heritage site). It features on the official list of 100 top Dutch heritage sites, drawn up in 1990 by what is today the Rijksdienst voor het Cultureel Erfgoed (National Cultural Heritage Service).

History
In 1104, a young priest by the name of Ailbertus of Antoing founded an Augustinian abbey in the Land of Rode, near the river Wurm. The abbey was called Kloosterrade, which later became  ( or ), after the ducal castle that was built across the Wurm. Ailbertus died in 1111 and his bones were later interred in the crypt. In 1136 the land of Rode, including the abbey, became the property of the Duchy of Limburg. Kloosterrade was considered to be their family church. Several dukes of Limburg are buried at Rolduc, such as Walram III, whose cenotaph can be found in the nave of the church. During the 12th and 13th century the abbey flourished. Several other communities were founded by Kloosterrade. In 1250 the abbey owned more than 3,000 hectares of land.

During the 14th, 15th and 16th centuries times were harder for the abbey in both spiritual and material terms. The buildings were heavily damaged during the Eighty Years War. Materialistically, the abbey began to prosper again in the late 17th century when revenue was generated from the exploitation of coal mines. In around 1775, Rolduc employed 350 miners.

The abbey was dissolved by the French in 1796 and the buildings were not used for 35 years. In 1815, when the United Kingdom of the Netherlands was formed (see Vienna Congress), the border was drawn through the ancient land of Rode, separating the abbey from the castle. The eastern part (including the castle) became Prussian Herzogenrath and the western part (including the abbey) became part of the Dutch municipality of Kerkrade.

In the 19th century Rolduc became a famous boarding school run by Jesuits, and a seminary of the Diocese of Roermond. Many influential Dutch Roman Catholics (e.g. the writer Lodewijk van Deyssel and the social reformer Alphons Ariëns) were educated at Rolduc.

The former abbey is now a secondary school (Charlemagne College, formerly College Rolduc), a Roman Catholic seminary, and the Rolduc Congress Center.

Description

The 12th century abbey church is an  example of Mosan art. The crypt and the choir and chancel above have a cloverleaf pattern. The interior of both the church and the crypt contains richly carved capitals. Remarkable is the fact that the columns in the crypt all have a different design. In 1853, the young architect Pierre Cuypers was commissioned to restore the crypt and to reinstate as much as possible the original Romanesque fabric.

The cloisters are largely 18th century. The abbey has a richly decorated Rococo library with an important collection of books. During the Middle Ages, the Rolduc library was one of the most famous libraries in the Meuse region. The history of the abbey was recorded in the so-called Annales Rodenses, a chronicle about the years 1104 through 1157.

The interior painting above the altar is by the Nazarene movement painter Matthias Goebbels.

References

External links

Website Rolduc seminary and conference centre (in Dutch and English)

Former Christian monasteries in the Netherlands
Christian monasteries in Limburg (Netherlands)
Augustinian monasteries in the Netherlands
Monasteries dissolved during the French Revolution
Catholic seminaries
Education in Limburg (Netherlands)
Romanesque architecture in the Netherlands
Mosan art
Rijksmonuments in Kerkrade
Seminaries and theological colleges in the Netherlands